Syntonarcha is a genus of moths of the family Crambidae.

Species
Syntonarcha iriastis Meyrick, 1890
Syntonarcha vulnerata T. P. Lucas, 1894

References

Natural History Museum Lepidoptera genus database

Odontiinae
Crambidae genera
Taxa named by Edward Meyrick